For the Mongol invasions of Serbia, see:
Mongol invasion of Bulgaria and Serbia (1242) by the army of Kadan of the horde of Batu Khan
Serbian conflict with the Nogai Horde (1291) by the Golden Horde under Nogai Khan